Salvia ballotiflora is a species of flowering plant in the mint family, Lamiaceae, that is native to  Texas in the United States as well as northeastern and central Mexico. Common names include shrubby blue sage and mejorana.

Description
Trichomes on the upper and lower surfaces of the leaves give them a rough texture.

Habitat and range
Salvia ballotiflora is found in the Edwards Plateau and Tamaulipan mezquital of southern and western Texas. Its range in Mexico includes the states of Coahuila, Durango, Hidalgo, Nuevo León, and Zacatecas. It prefers alkaline soils, such as those of limestone canyons.

Uses
The leaves of shrubby blue sage are used for flavoring foods. It is cultivated as an ornamental for its colorful blooms.

Notes

External links
 
 

ballotiflora
Flora of Coahuila
Flora of Durango
Flora of Hidalgo (state)
Flora of Nuevo León
Flora of Texas
Flora of Zacatecas